Gütersloh is a town in Germany, in North Rhine-Westphalia.

Gütersloh may also refer to:

Gütersloh (district), a Kreis (district) in the north-east of North Rhine-Westphalia
FC Gütersloh, football club based in Gütersloh
RAF Gütersloh, Royal Air Force German military base near the town

People with the surname
Albert Paris Gütersloh (1887–1973), Austrian painter and writer